Deutsche Börse AG or the Deutsche Börse Group, is a German multinational offering marketplace organizing for the trading of shares and other securities. It is also a transaction services provider.  It gives companies and investors access to global capital markets.  It is a joint stock company and was founded in 1992. The headquarters are in Frankfurt. On 1 October 2014, Deutsche Börse AG became the 14th announced member of the United Nations Sustainable Stock Exchanges initiative.

Company

More than 3,200 employees service customers in Europe, the United States, and Asia. Deutsche Börse has locations in Germany, Luxembourg, Switzerland, Czech Republic, and Spain, as well as representative offices in Beijing, London, Paris, Chicago, New York, Hong Kong, and Dubai.

FWB Frankfurter Wertpapierbörse (Frankfurt Stock Exchange), is one of the world's largest trading centers for securities.  With a share in turnover of around 90%, it is the largest of the German stock exchanges. Deutsche Börse AG operates the Frankfurt Stock Exchange.

Deutsche Börse is the owner of Clearstream, a clearing house based in Luxembourg.

Despite the COVID-19 pandemic, Deutsche Börse was able to increase its turnover by 15% and its net revenue by 9% in 2020 compared to 2019. In addition, Deutsche Börse's workforce grew by 463 employees in 2020.

Mergers and acquisitions
On 3 May 2000, it was announced that the London Stock Exchange would merge with Deutsche Börse, though the deal fell through before the merger could be realized.

In 2001, Deutsche Börse tried again to merge with the London Stock Exchange, followed by a takeover bid in late 2004, but both offers rejected by the LSE. After CEO Werner Seifert was forced to resign by the main shareholders in 2005, Deutsche Börse changed plans and entered into advanced negotiations for a merger with Euronext which would have brought two of the biggest stock exchanges in Europe into one holding. The New York Stock Exchange beat out Deutsche Börse's final bid for Euronext in 2006.

Since 2007, Deutsche Börse operates the joint venture Scoach with SIX Swiss Exchange to provide a European derivative trading platform.

In July 2015, Deutsche Börse bought the 360T company for €725 million and also acquired all shares (100%) of the joint venture STOXX AG for a purchase price of CHF 650 million from the SIX Group.

On September 16, 2019, Deutsche Börse has announced its acquisition of Axioma Inc. which was combined with STOXX and DAX to form Qontigo. As part of the transaction, Deutsche Börse has entered into a strategic partnership with General Atlantic, a global equity firm.

In March 2022, Deutsche Börse announced the acquisition of 100% of Luxembourg-based fund data manager Kneip.

Attempted NYSE Euronext merger

On 7 December 2008, Deutsche Börse rebuffed rumors that it might join with NYSE Euronext (the company formed as a result of the merger of NYSE and Euronext) to create the world's leading stock exchange. While the company claims that it pursued the matter, on 8 December 2008, it reported that talks which began on 25 November 2008, were closed without any result due to differences in valuation of the company.

Deutsche Börse had also considered the acquisition again in 2009.

On 9 February 2011, reports suggested that NYSE Euronext and Deutsche Börse were in advanced talks about an all-stock merger. Deutsche Börse was in advanced talks to buy NYSE Euronext in a deal that would create the world's largest trading powerhouse. The shares of both companies were temporarily frozen on the news due to the risk of large price movements and clarifications of the deal. A successful deal would see the new company becoming the world's largest stock exchange operator with a market capitalisation of listed companies equal to US$15 trillion, US$13.39 trillion of which is part of the much larger NYSE Euronext, which is approximately six times the size of Deutsche Börse.

President and deputy CEO of NYSE Euronext Dominique Cerutti would become the new company's president and head of commercial and internal technology. Roland Bellegarde, also of NYSE Euronext, would become the head of European cash equities. The new company would potentially have €300 million (US$410 million) in cost savings. However, the merger would be subject to review in both the United States and European Union under concerns it could create a "de facto monopoly". NYSE Euronext shareholders approved the Deutsche Börse's all-stock deal on 7 July 2011, and Deutsche Börse shareholders had accepted the deal by 15 July 2011.

On 22 December 2011, Deutsche Boerse won U.S. antitrust approval to buy NYSE Euronext, on the condition that a Deutsche Börse subsidiary, the International Securities Exchange, divest its 31.5% interest in Direct Edge. NYSE Euronext and Deutsche Boerse AG delayed the deadline for completing their merger until 31 March 2012, as the exchange operators try to persuade European regulators to approve the deal.

The European Commission blocked the merger on 1 February 2012, citing the fact that the merged company would have a near monopoly.
This measure taken by the EC is the fourth blocking in over a decade.
The commission rejected the merger on antitrust grounds, saying the combined businesses would dominate Europe's on-exchange derivatives trading with an estimated 93% market share. "This is a black day for Europe and its global competitiveness on financial markets", said former Deutsche Börse chief executive Reto Francioni. NYSE Euronext chairman Jan-Michiel Hessels said: "While we are disappointed and strongly disagree with the EU decision, which is based on a fundamentally different understanding of the derivatives market, it is now time to move on".

Failed merger with London Stock Exchange Group

In March 2016, the company announced it had reached an agreement with London Stock Exchange Group to merge. The companies were to be brought under a new holding company, UK TopCo, and would have retained both headquarters in London and Frankfurt. The deal needed approval from regulators in the European Union, the U.S. and Russia. The London Stock Exchange said Russian approval was needed because it owns Exactpro, a firm with offices in Russia specializing in quality assurance for exchanges and financial organizations. The European Commission opened an in-depth investigation into the proposed Deutsche Börse/LSEG merger on 28 September 2016. The European Commission delayed its decision on the deal by 15 working days to 6 March 2017. LSEG planned to hive off the French half of its LCH SA arm in a bid to ease EU concerns about the deal, although the companies had not formally submitted any concessions to the Commission.

In February 2017, the Commission required that the parties commit to the divestment of LSEG's majority stake in fixed-income sovereign bond trading platform MTS S.p.A. LSEG stated it would not sell MTS in Italy to appease anti-trust concerns. The planned merger between the two exchanges, which was estimated to create the largest exchange in Europe, was subsequently described as "at risk" by The Wall Street Journal. The merger attempt was blocked by EU Competition Regulator on 29 March 2017 stating that "The Commission's investigation concluded the merger would have created a de facto monopoly in the markets for clearing fixed income instruments".

Recent
In October 2017, several shareholders called for the resignation of the chairman.

On 16 November 2017, Theodor Weimer was appointed as new CEO of Deutsche Börse AG, effective January 2018.

Art collection
Deutsche Börse Group is a major sponsor of contemporary photography. In 1999, the Group established the Art Collection Deutsche Börse, which today comprises more than 900 mostly large size works from around 90 international artists. In 2005, the stock exchange became the sponsor of the annually awarded Deutsche Börse Photography Prize of the Photographers' Gallery in London, which was started up in 1996 by the gallery, to promote the best work by contemporary photographers.

Charity involvement

Deutsche Börse Group have participated in and sponsored many events, including Futures For Kids Annual Football Tournament (held in the Docklands, England).  The event raised £2.6 million for charity and included firms such as Marex Spectron, Trading Technologies, Futex, Oak Futures and the LME.

References

External links

 
Financial services companies established in 1992
Companies based in Frankfurt
Financial services companies of Germany
Companies in the Euro Stoxx 50